The Co-Operative Arts & Science College is located in Olavakkode in Palakkad, Kerala in southern India. The College subscribes to a syllabus under the University of Calicut. The college offers a wide variety of degree programs including B.Com, BSC, BA, M.Com, MA and management courses.

References

Arts and Science colleges in Kerala
Universities and colleges in Palakkad